= La Voz del Pueblo (Bogotá) =

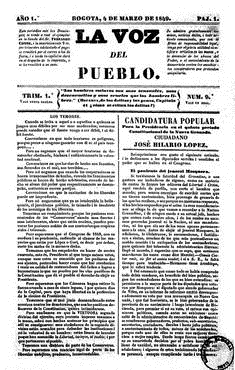
- Front page of La Voz del Pueblo, 4 March 1849.
- Type: Weekly
- Founded: January 7, 1849
- Ceased publication: March 4, 1849
- Political alignment: Liberal
- Language: Spanish language
- Headquarters: Bogotá

La Voz del Pueblo (English: People's Voice) was a liberal weekly newspaper published from Bogotá, Colombia in 1849.

== History ==
The first issue of the newspaper was published on January 7, 1849. It came out on Sundays. The newspaper was identified with the opposition against the incumbent government. The ninth, and last, issue of La Voz del Pueblo came out on 4 March 1849.
